The San Lázaro Roman aqueduct (Spanish: Acueducto Romano San Lázaro) is a Roman aqueduct located in Mérida, Spain. It was declared Bien de Interés Cultural in 1912.

See also 
 List of Bien de Interés Cultural in the Province of Badajoz

List of aqueducts in the Roman Empire
List of Roman aqueducts by date
Ancient Roman technology
Roman engineering

References 

Aqueducts in Spain
Ancient Roman buildings and structures in Spain
Buildings and structures in Mérida, Spain
Roman aqueducts outside Rome
History of Extremadura
Bien de Interés Cultural landmarks in the Province of Badajoz